2014 Rugby Europe Women's Sevens Division B is a lowest division European Championships, that will be held in Vingis Park Rugby Stadium, Vilnius, Lithuania.

12 Teams had to compete in the championships: Lithuania, Austria, Slovakia, Luxembourg, Andorra, Turkey, Malta, Latvia, Serbia, Israel, Hungary, Bosnia and Herzegovina. Eventually Andorra and Bosnia & Herzegovina withdrew, so they were replaced by Slovenia and Bulgaria.

Results

Group A

Group B

Group C

Group D

Knockout stage

Bowl

Plate semifinals (5th/8th)
Slovakia 0-39 Malta
Luxembourg 0-33 Turkey

7th/8th place
Slovakia 24-5 Luxembourg

Plate final (5th/6th)
Malta 26-12 Turkey

Cup semifinals (1st/4th)
Lithuania 15-5 Latvia
Hungary 35-12 Israel

3rd place
Latvia 14-31 Israel

Cup final
Hungary 40-5 Lithuania

Semifinals

Final

Final standings

References

2014
B
rugby sevens
International rugby union competitions hosted by Lithuania
rugby sevens
21st century in Vilnius
June 2014 sports events in Europe